The 2017 Czech Rally Championship season was be an international rally championship. The championship was contested by a combination of regulations with Group R competing directly against Super 2000 and WRC cars for points.

Calendar

Teams and drivers

Czech Rally Championship 
{|
|

References

External links

Results

Czech Rally Championship seasons
Czech
Rally